John Roberts (born 1955) is the 17th Chief Justice of the United States.

John Roberts may also refer to:

Politicians and government officials
General John Roberts (fl. 1604), MP for Chippenham
John Roberts (Denbigh MP) (after 1672–1731), Member of Parliament for Denbigh, 1710–1713 & 1715–1722
John S. Roberts, signer of the Texas Declaration of Independence
John Roberts (Flint MP) (1835–1894), Welsh member of parliament
John Roberts, 1st Baron Clwyd (1863–1955), Welsh Liberal politician, son of the above
John Roberts (Canadian politician) (1933–2007), Canadian politician
John Roberts (mayor) (1845–1934), mayor of Dunedin, New Zealand, 1889–90
John Bryn Roberts (1843–1931), Welsh lawyer, judge and Liberal politician
John Mackintosh Roberts (1840–1928), New Zealand soldier, resident magistrate and administrator
John McRoberts, former Northern Territory police commissioner

Academics
John Milton Roberts (1916–1990), American anthropologist
John D. Roberts (1918–2016), professor of chemistry at the California Institute of Technology
John Roberts (historian) (1928–2003), Oxford historian and author
Donald John Roberts (born 1945), or John Roberts, professor of economics at the Business School of Stanford University
John Cole Roberts (born 1935), Welsh geologist, senior lecturer at University of Ulster
John Keith Roberts (1897–1944), Australian physicist

Businessmen
John Roberts (Australian businessman) (1934–2006), founder of Australian construction firm Multiplex
John Roberts (British businessman), founder of AO World
John P. Roberts (1945–2001), producer who bankrolled the Woodstock Festival
John S. Roberts, president of F. W. Woolworth Company

Military
Bartholomew Roberts (1682–1722), born John Roberts, Welsh pirate
John Hamilton Roberts (1881–1962), Canadian Army two-star general
John Q. Roberts (1914–1942), United States Navy officer, pilot, and Navy Cross recipient
John W. Roberts (1921–1999), United States Air Force four-star general
John Roberts (Royal Navy officer) (born 1924), British admiral

Television personalities
John Roberts (actor) (born 1971), American actor and comedian
John Roberts (journalist) (born 1956), Fox News national correspondent, former CNN and CBS News television journalist and former Canadian music television host
John Roberts (sportscaster) (born 1965), American television host specializing in motorsports

Music
John Roberts (electronic musician), American electronic musician
John Roberts (musician) (born c. 1940), English performer of English and North Atlantic folk music and dance
John Roberts (born 1952), former drummer for the Shadows of Knight
John Roberts, music educator for International Association for Jazz Education
John Storm Roberts (1936–2009), British-born, U.S.-based ethnomusicologist, writer and record producer

Sportsmen

Association football (soccer)
John Roberts (footballer, born 1857) (1857–?), Welsh international footballer
John Roberts (footballer, born 1858) (1858–?), Welsh international footballer
John Roberts (footballer, born 1885) (1885–19??), English footballer who played for Wolverhampton Wanderers and Bristol Rovers
John Roberts (footballer, born 1887) (1887–19??), English-born footballer active in Italy for Milan and Modena
John Roberts (footballer, born 1891) (1891–19??), Scottish footballer
John Roberts (footballer, born 1944), Australian international soccer player who played in The Football League in the 1960s and 70s
John Roberts (footballer, born 1946) (1946–2016), Welsh international footballer who played for Wrexham and Arsenal

Cricket
John Roberts (Lancashire cricketer) (1933–2019), English cricketer
John Roberts (Shropshire cricketer) (born 1948), English cricketer
John Roberts (Somerset cricketer) (born 1949), English cricketer

Other sports
John Roberts Jr. (billiards player) (1847–1919), professional player of English billiards
John Roberts (footballer, born 1881) (1881–1956), Australian rules footballer who played for South Melbourne
John Roberts (hurler) (1895–1987), Irish hurler
John Roberts (rugby union) (1906–1965), Welsh rugby player
John Roberts (American football) (1920–2012), American football, wrestling and track coach
John Roberts (rower) (born 1953), British Olympic rower
John Roberts (footballer, born 1956), Australian rules footballer who played for South Melbourne/Sydney Swans and in South Australia

Clergymen
Saint John Roberts (martyr) (c. 1576–1610), Welsh Benedictine monk
John Roberts (Vicar of Tremeirchion) (1775–1829), Welsh Anglican priest and writer
Saint John Roberts (missionary) (1853–1949), Welsh Anglican priest, writer and missionary in Wyoming, USA
John Roberts (Presbyterian) (1880–1959), Welsh Presbyterian Church of Wales minister and historian
John Roberts, bardic name Ieuan Gwyllt (1822–1877), Welsh musician and Calvinistic Methodist minister

Others
John Roberts (poet) (1712–1772), British politician and poet
John Roberts (architect) (1712–1796), Irish architect
John Roberts (urban planner) (1929–1992), British transportation planner
John Maddox Roberts (born 1947), American author
John Roberts (writer) (born 1947), English journalist and author
John Roberts, British film director of War of the Buttons
John D. Roberts (1918–2016), chemist
John Martyn Roberts (1806–1878), British inventor
John Marshall Roberts, American public speaker and communication strategist
John Bingham Roberts (1852–1924), American doctor giving his name to Roberts syndrome
John Roberts (engineer) (fl. 1969–2006), British structural engineer
John Roberts, co-founder of Edapt and Oak National Academy

See also
Jack Roberts (disambiguation)
Jon Roberts (1948–2011), drug trafficker
Jon H. Roberts, American historian
Jonathan Roberts (disambiguation)
John Robarts (disambiguation)